Discernment is the ability to obtain sharp perceptions or to judge well (or the activity of so doing).  In the case of judgement, discernment can be psychological, moral or aesthetic in nature.  Discernment has also been defined in the contexts; scientific (that is discerning what is true about the real world), normative (discerning value including what ought to be) and formal (deductive reasoning). The process of discernment within judgment, involves going past the mere perception of something and making nuanced judgments about its properties or qualities.  Discernment in the Christian religion is considered as a virtue, a discerning individual is considered to possess wisdom, and be of good judgement; especially so with regard to subject matter often overlooked by others.

Process of discernment 
The process of individual discernment has steps that can be taken in order to achieve a level of discernment. The following actions can be made when making decisions of discernment; taking time in making decisions, using both the head and heart, and assessing important values involved in the situation. Time has been considered necessary in the process of making a smart choice and decisions made in a hurry can be altered by lack of contemplation. When time is available to assess the situation it improves the discernment process. When time allots the tentative decision can be revisited days later and external people can be consulted to make sure that the individual is satisfied with their choice. Making decisions is involved with discernment and they require both the "head" and the "heart". Making decisions with the "head" means to first reflect on the situation and emphasize the rational aspect of the decision making process. In order to make a decision with the 'heart'' the individual needs to make decisions based on feelings as well as rationality. Values in the discernment process are weighing options that decide what is most important to the individual. Every individual’s value system is different which affects each individual discernment process. Combining values, using both the head and heart and taking sufficient time when making decision are the main steps for a successful discernment process.

Group discernment is a separate branch of discernment. In group discernment each individual must first undergo their own discernment process. The individual must keep in mind what is best for the group as a whole as well as the individual when making a decision. The same principles of values, using the head and heart, as well as giving the decision making process ample time all still apply in group discernment. Group discernment is different because it requires multiple people to have a unanimous decision in order to move forward. Group discernment requires discussion and persuasion between individuals to arrive at a decision.

References

Knowledge